L. C. (Lewis Charles) Rodd (1905 - 1979) was the husband of novelist Kylie Tennant. Biographer of Fr. John Hope, long-serving rector of Christ Church St. Laurence in George Street, Sydney.

Some of Rodd's papers are held by the National Library of Australia.

LC Rodd was head of Woolwich Primary School around 1945.

Works
 John Hope of Christ Church: a Sydney Church era (biography) 
 A Gentle Shipwreck (autobiography) (Sydney, Thomas Nelson, 1975) (illustrated by Cedric Emanuel) 

1905 births
1979 deaths